Witch Mountain may refer to:

Witch Mountain (band), a doom metal band from Portland, Oregon
Witch Mountain, a Disney film franchise, which originated with:
Escape to Witch Mountain (1968), a science fiction novel
Escape to Witch Mountain (1975 film), a 1975 Disney live-action film based on the novel
Return from Witch Mountain (1978), a film sequel to the 1975 film
Beyond Witch Mountain (1982), a film sequel to the 1978 film
Escape to Witch Mountain (1995 film), a 1995 television film based on the novel
Race to Witch Mountain (2009), a Disney live-action film remade from the 1975 Disney live-action film and using elements from the 1968 novel